Arinj, is a major village in the Kotayk Province of Armenia. Arinj is an upscale suburb located just north of Yerevan, with several mansions belonging to multimillionaires located there including the mansion of Gagik Tsarukyan, the founder of the Prosperous Armenia party. The village is 41 km south of the provincial capital Hrazdan. As of the 2011 census, the population of the village is 6,220.

See also 
Kotayk Province

References

Populated places in Kotayk Province
Yazidi populated places in Armenia